Steve "Snakeman" Alker (born 14 February 1964) is a Welsh retired professional darts player who competed in British Darts Organisation and Professional Darts Corporation events.

Career
Alker won the 1998 Welsh Open, beating Colin Monk in the final. He was also a semi-finalist in the 2000 British Open. He played in the 2001 BDO World Darts Championship and 2002 Winmau World Masters but lost in the first round of both tournaments.

At the 2005 UK Open, where starting in the preliminary round, he went on to win five matches, including a victory over Kevin Painter before losing to Phil Taylor in the fifth round. In the 2006 PDC World Darts Championship he reached the last 16, beating Alan Caves and Denis Ovens before losing to Wayne Jones.

Alker quit the BDO in 2019.

Personal life

Alker and his wife were convicted in 2016 of animal welfare offences and banned from keeping animals for ten years.

World Championship results

BDO

 2001: 1st Round (lost to Matt Clark 0–3)

PDC

 2006: 3rd Round (lost to Wayne Jones 1–4)

References

External links
Profile and stats on Darts Database

1964 births
Living people
Welsh darts players
Professional Darts Corporation early era players
British Darts Organisation players
People convicted of cruelty to animals